Aqqaba is a Palestinian town located on a slope in the Jordan Valley in the northern West Bank, 15 kilometers northeast of Jenin in the Tubas Governorate of the State of Palestine. According to the Palestinian Central Bureau of Statistics (PCBS), the town had a population of 6,598 inhabitants in the 2007 census.

History
Pottery remains from the Persian, Hellenistic and Byzantine eras have been found here.

'Aqqaba is identified with Iqbin, mentioned in the 6th-7th century Mosaic of Reḥob as a Jewish settlement in the region of Sebastia inhabited mostly by non-Jews and, therefore, agricultural produce obtained from the area could be taken by Jews without the normal restrictions imposed during the Sabbatical years, or the need for tithing.

Ottoman era
'Aqqaba, like the rest of Palestine, was incorporated into the Ottoman Empire in 1517, and in the census of 1596, the village was located in the Nahiya of Jabal Sami of the Liwa of Nablus. The population was 22 households and 5 bachelors, all Muslim. The villagers paid a fixed tax rate of 33.3% on various agricultural products, such as wheat, barley, summer crops, olive trees, goats and/or beehives, in addition to "occasional revenues"; a total of 5,982  akçe.

In 1870 Victor Guérin found the village to have 130 inhabitants, who had a mosque in the eastern part of the village.

In 1882, the PEF's Survey of Western Palestine described it as "a good sized village on the northern slope of Ras el Akra. It is surrounded with brushwood on the hills, but has arable land below."

British  Mandate of Palestine
In the 1922 census of Palestine, conducted by the British Mandate authorities, 'Aqqaba had a population of 330; 322 Muslims and 8 Christian Orthodox, increasing in the 1931 census to 411; 9 Christians and 403 Muslims, in a total of 89 houses.

In the 1945 statistics the population was 600; 20 Christians and 580  Muslims, with 8,068 dunams of land, according to an official land and population survey. Of this, 1,259 dunams were used for plantations and irrigable land, 4,284 dunams were for cereals, while 54 dunams were built-up (urban) land.

Jordanian era
In the wake of the 1948 Arab–Israeli War, and after the 1949 Armistice Agreements, 'Aqqaba came under  Jordanian rule.

In 1961, the population had reached 1,164.

Post 1967
Since the Six-Day War in 1967, 'Aqqaba has been held under Israeli occupation.

'Aqqaba is made up of three main families: Abu Arra, Abu Ghannam and al-Masri. During clear weather, Haifa could be seen from the west on the Mediterranean Sea as well as the summit of Jabal ash-Sheikh in Lebanon, while from the east the mountains of Ajloun in Jordan are clearly seen day and night. 'Aqqaba is the highest point in the Tubas Governorate. 'Aqqaba lies five kilometers east the Arab American University.

References

Bibliography

External links
 Welcome To 'Aqqaba
 Survey of Western Palestine, Map 12:  IAA, Wikimedia commons
 Aqqaba Village Profile,  Applied Research Institute–Jerusalem, ARIJ,  February, 2006
 Aqqaba (Fact Sheet), ARIJ,  February, 2006

Tubas Governorate
Towns in the West Bank
Municipalities of the State of Palestine
Ancient Jewish settlements of Samaria